Muhammad Ali Mazidi (May 10, 1954 - August 30, 2022) was an Iranian electrical engineer and lecturer. Mazidi went to Tabriz University and held master's degrees from both Southern Methodist University and the University of Texas at Dallas. He was the founder of MicroDigitalEd and taught microprocessor-based system design. He was also a scholar of and occasional lecturer on the Baháʼí Faith. He had authored/co-authored a number of books, available from Prentice Hall and Amazon Kindle:

 80X86 IBM PC and Compatible Computers: Assembly Language, Design, and Interfacing Volumes I & II, Prentice Hall
 x86 PC: Assembly Language, Design, and Interfacing, Prentice Hall
 8051 Microcontroller and Embedded Systems, Prentice Hall
 PIC Microcontroller and Embedded Systems, Prentice Hall
 HCS12 Microcontroller and Embedded Systems, Prentice Hall
 AVR Microcontroller and Embedded Systems, Prentice Hall
 ARM Assembly Language Programming & Architecture, Amazon Kindle
 TI ARM Peripherals Programming and Interfacing, Amazon Kindle
 Freescale ARM Cortex-M Embedded Programming, Amazon Kindle

External links 
 MicroDigitalEd.com (Website to accompany the books)

Iranian technology writers
Living people
Southern Methodist University alumni
University of Texas at Dallas alumni
1954 births